Charlie Holmes (January 27, 1910 near Boston, Massachusetts – September 19, 1985 in Stoughton, Massachusetts) was an American alto jazz saxophonist of the swing era. He also played clarinet and oboe for the Boston Civic Symphony Orchestra in 1926.

Career 
Holmes began playing also saxophone at age 16 and emulated the style of his childhood friend, Johnny Hodges. He began playing professionally a week later. After moving to New York City he worked for a variety of groups, including Luis Russell in 1928. Between 1929 and 1930, he recorded with Red Allen, and is best known for composing "Sugar Hill Function". He would work with Russell again a few times and in 1932 joined the Mills Blue Rhythm Band. He was in the John Kirby's Sextet, Cootie Williams' Orchestra, and Louis Armstrong's band for much of the next two decades. He left music in 1951 and did not return for twenty years. He returned to work in Clyde Bernhardt's Harlem Blues & Jazz Band, and later played for the Swedish band Kustbandet. They made a recording together in 1975 (Kenneth Records KS 2039). Holmes was not fit to go to Stockholm so he played his solos on tape in a New York City studio and the material was transferred to the Swedish master tape.  He never acted as a leader in any recording or group.

References

Bibliography
Kernfield, Barry. "Holmes, Charlie [Charles William]". Encyclopedia of Popular Music. Oxford University Press

External links
Allmusic Biography
Charlie Holmes recordings at the Discography of American Historical Recordings.

1910 births
1985 deaths
American jazz saxophonists
American male saxophonists
20th-century American saxophonists
20th-century American male musicians
American male jazz musicians
Harlem Blues and Jazz Band members
Mills Blue Rhythm Band members